Sandoricum is an Asian genus of plants in the family Meliaceae. It contains the economically significant santol fruit tree.

Species
The following species are listed in the Catalogue of Life:
 Sandoricum beccarianum 
 Sandoricum borneense
 Sandoricum caudatum
 Sandoricum dasyneuron
 Sandoricum koetjape — Santol tree
 Sandoricum vidalii

References

External links

 
Meliaceae genera
Taxonomy articles created by Polbot
Taxa named by Antonio José Cavanilles